Spanish Lake is located in the Bluff Swamp on the Iberville - Ascension Parish line.

Early European settlers of the area that was developed as French and Spanish ancestry.

Among the projects and plans carried out by Luis de Unzaga 'le Conciliateur' while he was governor of Louisiana between 1769 and 1777 was the promotion of new settlements by Europeans, among them were French Acadians and Malaga in the fertile Mississippi region and more specifically in the Unzaga Post or 'Puesto de Unzaga' that he created in 1771 in Pointe Coupee, the parish of Saint Gabriel in 1773 and Fort Manchac in 1776.

It is fed into by Alligator Bayou, Brand Bayou, Bayou Braud, and Bayou Paul.  Spanish Lake is a part of the Bluff Swamp Wildlife Refuge and Botanical Gardens, a national non-profit organization which has preserved  of Bluff Swamp.

References

External links
  Bayou Braud, Spanish Lake, and Alligator Bayou, LA Ecosystem Restoration Project US Army Corps of Engineers

Lakes of Louisiana
Bodies of water of Ascension Parish, Louisiana
Bodies of water of Iberville Parish, Louisiana